Enrichi Finica (born 19 July 2002), also known as Eric Finica, is a Moldovan professional footballer who plays as a left-back for Politehnica Iași on loan from Rapid București.

Club career
Finica made his debut on 16 May 2022 for Rapid București in Liga I match against CS Mioveni.

References

External links
 
 

2002 births
Living people
Moldovan footballers
Romanian footballers
Association football defenders
Moldova youth international footballers
Romania youth international footballers
Liga II players
Liga I players
FC Rapid București
FC Politehnica Iași (2010) players
Moldovan expatriate footballers
Moldovan expatriate sportspeople in Italy
Romanian expatriate footballers
Romanian expatriate sportspeople in Italy
Expatriate footballers in Italy